Evelyn is an electoral ward in the northernmost part of the London Borough of Lewisham. It covers the northern part of Deptford on the south bank of the River Thames, and is the only Lewisham ward that borders the river. Occupying the northern corner of the London Borough of Lewisham, the Evelyn ward borders only one other Lewisham ward, which is New Cross to the south. But Evelyn borders wards from three other London Boroughs, Greenwich West in the Royal Borough of Greenwich to the east, Surrey Docks of the London Borough of Southwark to the northwest, and across the River Thames on the Isle of Dogs, the Millwall ward from the London Borough of Tower Hamlets.

Name
It is named after John Evelyn who settled in Deptford with his wife in 1652. Their house, Sayes Court, adjacent to the naval dockyard, was purchased by Evelyn from his father-in-law Sir Richard Browne in 1653 and Evelyn soon began to transform the gardens.

Transport
The A200 road, Evelyn Street, runs through the ward. Deptford railway station is located in the southeast of the ward where Evelyn's entire southern border follows the railway line.

References

Wards of the London Borough of Lewisham
Deptford